Filippos Veria H.C. (Greek: Φίλιππος Βέροιας) is a Greek handball club based in Veria, section of multi-sports club Filippos Veria. The handball department of Filippos was founded in 1977 and its colours are white and red. Its emblem is Philip of Macedonia. Filippos is also known as "Vasilias (the king)" and it is the second most successful club in Premier Handball/A1 Ethniki history.

History
Filippos Veria Handball Club was founded in 1977, when the first Greek Handball tournament was held. Filippos won the first tournament in 1977, organised by SEGAS.  The next years Filippos won 8 moreover championships (reaching 9 totally) and 5 cups and became the club with the most titles in Greek Handball along with Ionikos Nea Filadelphia. In 2003 Filippos played in the final of EHF Challenge Cup but it was defeated by Danish team Skjern Håndbold. It was the first Greek handball club that played in a final of a European competition. Filippos also participated in 2003–04 EHF Champions League where they achieved three wins in six matches and they were disqualified in a quadruple tie as they had the worst GD. After four years of decline, Filippos finished 4th in the A1 championship and after PAOK's rejection to play in the EHF Challenge Cup, they registered to the competition and they'll replace the team. This was the first time after five years that Filippos would participate in a European competition. Moreover, Theodoros Karipidis (president and owner of Veria), involvement in Filippos, boosted club's morale and confidence and it appears that there's an opportunity for the dream to resurrect from its ashes. In co-operation with Karipidis,
the board of the club achieved to sign the captain of the Greek national team, Giorgos Mastrogiannis, as well as Savvas Karypidis.

Recent seasons

European record

Honours
Greek Men's Handball Championship
Winner (9): 1986, 1988, 1989, 1990, 1991, 1994, 1995, 2003, 2016
Greek Men's Handball Cup
Winner (6): 1985, 1991, 1992, 2003, 2007, 2016
EHF Cup Winners' Cup
Semi-finals (1): 1993
EHF Challenge Cup
Runners-up (1): 2003

Current squad
Season 2015–16

Technical staff

See also
Filippos Veria
Filippos Verias B.C.
Veria F.C.
GE Verias

References

External links
Official Site
A.C. Filippos Verias eurohandball.com, Filippos Verias 

Greek handball clubs
Sport in Veria